Lasiothyris ichthyochroa is a species of moth of the  family Tortricidae. It is found on the Virgin Islands, including Saint Croix.

References

Moths described in 1897
Cochylini